You Don't Shoot at Angels is a 1960 West German comedy crime film directed by Rolf Thiele and starring Ruth Leuwerik, Hannes Messemer and Gustav Knuth.

The film's sets were designed by the art directors Robert Herlth and Robert Stratil. It was shot at the Bavaria Studios in Munich and on location in Naples.

Cast
Ruth Leuwerik as Maria
Hannes Messemer as Suarez
Gustav Knuth as Carlos
Boy Gobert as Federico
Bruno Hübner as Cosme
Ilse Steppat as Bellini
Ina Duscha as Nuria
Peer Schmidt as Kommissar
Ida Ehre as Äbtissin

See also
Peaches in Syrup (1960)

References

External links

Auf Engel schießt man nicht 

1960s crime comedy films
German crime comedy films
West German films
Films directed by Rolf Thiele
German films based on plays
Films about Catholic nuns
Films set in Naples
Films shot at Bavaria Studios
Gloria Film films
German black-and-white films
1960s German-language films
1960s German films